Bishop Abraham (formerly Fr. Ishak Azmy Boules) serves as the Auxiliary Bishop of Diakonia (i.e., Social Services) in the Coptic Orthodox Diocese of Los Angeles, Southern California, and Hawaii. He is also the Vice Head of the Ecumenical Relations Committee of the Holy Synod of the Coptic Orthodox Church.

Early life and service 
He earned his Bachelor of Arts degree in Commerce and Accounting in 1987, from Ain Shams University, in Cairo. Following his graduation, he became a consecrated servant in the Bishopric of Public, Ecumenical, and Social Services in February of 1988. During this time, he also served in the Church of St. Mary in Masarra, Shoubra, Cairo. In 1997, he was ordained a consecrated deacon.

St. Paul Abbey 
On May 31, 2001, Pope Shenouda III and Bishop Serapion ordained him a celibate priest with the name Fr. Ishak Paul, to serve in the St. Paul Brotherhood (now known as Saint Paul Abbey), in Los Angeles California. He was the first consecrated priest to be ordained for the St. Paul Brotherhood service.

On March 14, 2016, he was elevated to the dignity of Hegumen, by Metropolitan Serapion. On May 8, 2016, he was tonsured a monk by Bishop Sarabamon at the Monastery of Abba Antony in Yermo, California.

Episcopate 
On June 12, 2016, Pope Tawadros II consecrated him as an auxiliary bishop with the name Bishop Abraham, to assist Metropolitan Serapion and serve in the Diocese of Los Angeles, Southern California and Hawaii.

See also 
 Metropolitan Serapion
Bishop Suriel
 Bishop Kyrillos

References 

1965 births
Living people
Coptic Orthodox bishops
Coptic Orthodox Church in the United States